Pudupatti is a panchayat village in Thanjavur district and sub-district in the Indian state of Tamil Nadu.

Geography
It is located between Sengipatti and Budalur on Poondimadha basilica main road.

History
In the last century it belongs to Koonampatti jameen. In the ancient period it was ruled by Cholas. There are numerous temples around this village that were built by cholas.

Economy
The peoples main occupation is agriculture. Paddy, Groundnut, Gingelly, Sunflower, Sugarcane are the main cultivation.

Administration
The Panchayat comprises Maathuraarpudukottai, Muthandipatti, Magilapuram, Aarampoondaanpatti and Chinnamuthandipatti villages. Now this village belongs to Tiruvaiyaaru constituency and Thanjavur district.

Demographics
 Pudupatti had a population of 1,714 in 363 households. Males constitute 66% of the population and females 34%. Pudupatti has an average literacy rate of 70%, higher than the national average of 59.5%: male literacy is 74%, and female literacy is 52%. In Pudupatti, 19% of the population is under 6 years of age.

References

Villages in Thanjavur district